Big Brother 2011 is the seventh season of the Finnish reality television series Big Brother. The season premiered on 31 August 2011, on Sub and the finale was aired on 11 December 2011. The show is produced by Endemol Finland Oy. The seventh season was confirmed on 8 March 2011, in a press release issued from Sub.

Elina Viitanen and Susanna Laine both returned to host the show, though it was originally reported that Laine would not continue. Viitanen is the host of Big Brother Extra and Big Brother Talk Show, and Laine hosts Big Brother Talk Show alongside Viitanen. Viitanen also joined the House as a Guest Housemate on Day 70.

Housemates

Housemate exchange
A housemate exchange happened between Big Brother Suomi and Big Brother Norge. 24 years old ambulance driver and a student Siv Anita from the Norwegian Big Brother house exchanged with Janica for a period of time.

Straw Swap 
Straw Swap (Oljenkorsi) is a competition, where nominated housemates compete with each other. The winner is allowed to do a swap where he or she chooses either herself or himself or somebody other nominated away from the eviction. The winner must choose a non-nominated housemate to replace the swapped person for eviction.

Nominations table

Notes
 No nominations, because Weeks 1 and Week 2 had a "final week voting", where the winner has given immunity in all evictions, always up to a final week. The winner was told to the housemates on 14 October 2011.
 Veera has two weeks immunity, because she is new in the house. Housemates do not know about this, except for Veera.
 Salar had already been nominated as breaking rules ongoingly. Also he cannot be involved in Straw Swap and nominate nobody.
 Six housemates are under of Eviction and that is why Straw Swap is not in this week.
 Matti broke the rules and was instantly nominated without a change for Straw Swap.
 Suvi and Annika failed in a task and were instantly nominated without a change for Straw Swap.
 No nominations because Mikael, Sebastian, Suvi, Annika and Veera failed in a task and were instantly nominated without a change for Straw Swap.
 The public voted to nominate. On Week 7, the two housemates with the most votes were nominated. On Week 12, the three housemates with the fewest votes were nominated. Then, the non-nominated housemates voted to evict one of them.

TV rating

References

External links
Official Website 

2011 Finnish television seasons
07